Erythemis collocata, the western pondhawk, is a dragonfly of the family Libellulidae, native to western Canada, the western United States, and Mexico.

Food Resources 
Erythemis collocata is known to feed on the western malaria mosquito, Anopheles freeborni. This predation primarily occurs at dusk, when A. freeborni aggregate into swarms in order to mate. Due to the reliance of E. collocata on visual stimuli to attack its prey, the frequency of attacks decreases as the sky gets darker.

References

External links

Libellulidae
Odonata of North America
Insects of Mexico
Insects of the United States
Fauna of the Western United States
Fauna of the California chaparral and woodlands
Fauna of the Sierra Nevada (United States)
Insects described in 1861
Taxa named by Hermann August Hagen